Lamellodiscus is a genus of monopisthocotylean monogeneans in the family Diplectanidae; all species of Lamellodiscus are small worms, parasitic on the gills of teleost fish.

The type-species of the genus is Lamellodiscus typicus Johnston & Tiegs, 1922, a parasite of a sparid fish caught in Moreton Bay, Queensland, Australia.

Etymology
T. Harvey Johnston & Oscar Werner Tiegs, who created the genus in 1922, did not formally explain the etymology of the new name. However, their definition of the new genus "disc well developed, with the accessory locomotory disc (squamodisc) peculiarly modified in such a way as to present numerous concentric rows consisting each of a pair of laterally elongated lamellae" shows that the name refers to the lamellae of the squamodisc (an attachment organ). Such an organ is now called a lamellodisc.

Hosts
Hosts of Lamellodiscus species are mainly sparids and lethrinids, with very rare cases reported from centracanthids, pomacanthids and pomacentrids.

Species
Species include:

 Lamellodiscus acanthopagri Roubal, 1981 
 Lamellodiscus baeri Oliver, 1974 
 Lamellodiscus bidens Euzet , 1984 
 Lamellodiscus butcheri Byrnes, 1987 
 Lamellodiscus caballeroi Venkatanarsaiah & Kullkarni, 1980 
 Lamellodiscus cirrusspiralis Byrnes, 1987 
 Lamellodiscus confusus Amine, Euzet & Kechemir-Issad, 2007 
 Lamellodiscus corallinus  Paperna, 1965 
 Lamellodiscus coronatus Euzet & Oliver, 1966 
 Lamellodiscus crampus Neifar, 2008 
 Lamellodiscus dentexi Aleshkina, 1984 
 Lamellodiscus donatellae Aquaro, Riva & Galli, 2009 
 Lamellodiscus drummondi Euzet & Oliver, 1967 
 Lamellodiscus echeneis (Wagener, 1857) 
 Lamellodiscus elegans Bychowsky, 1957 
 Lamellodiscus epsilon Yamaguti, 1968 
 Lamellodiscus ergensi Euzet & Oliver, 1966 
 Lamellodiscus erythrini Euzet & Oliver, 1966 
 Lamellodiscus euzeti Diamanka, Boudaya, Toguebaye & Pariselle, 2011 
 Lamellodiscus falcus Amine, Euzet & Kechemir-Issad, 2006 
 Lamellodiscus flagellatus Boudaya, Neifar & Euzet, 2009 
 Lamellodiscus fraternus Bychowsky, 1957 
 Lamellodiscus furcillatus Kritsky, Jimenez-Ruiz & Sey, 2000 
 Lamellodiscus furcosus Euzet & Oliver, 1966 
 Lamellodiscus gracilis Euzet & Oliver, 1966 
 Lamellodiscus hilii Euzet, 1984 
 Lamellodiscus ignoratus Palombi, 1943 
 Lamellodiscus impervius Euzet, 1984 
 Lamellodiscus indicus Tripathi, 1959 
 Lamellodiscus kechemirae Amine & Euzet, 2005 
 Lamellodiscus knoepffleri Oliver, 1969 
 Lamellodiscus magnicornis Justine & Briand, 2010 
 Lamellodiscus major Murray, 1931 
 Lamellodiscus mirandus Euzet & Oliver, 1966 
 Lamellodiscus mormyri Euzet & Oliver, 1967 
 Lamellodiscus neifari Amine, Euzet & Kechemir-Issad, 2006 
 Lamellodiscus niedashui Li, Zhang & Yang, 1995 
 Lamellodiscus pagrosomi Murray, 1931 
 Lamellodiscus parisi Oliver, 1969 
 Lamellodiscus parvicornis Justine & Briand, 2010 
 Lamellodiscus rastellus Neifar, Euzet & Oliver, 2004 
 Lamellodiscus sanfilippoi Amine, Neifar & Euzet , 2006 
 Lamellodiscus sarculus Neifar, Euzet & Oliver, 2004 
 Lamellodiscus sigillatus Neifar, Euzet & Oliver, 2004 
 Lamellodiscus spari Zhukov, 1970 
 Lamellodiscus squamosus Roubal, 1981 
 Lamellodiscus takitai Ogawa & Eugusa, 1978 
 Lamellodiscus theroni Amine, Euzet & Kechemir-Issad, 2007 
 Lamellodiscus toguebayei Diamanka, Neifar, Pariselle & Euzet , 2011 
 Lamellodiscus tomentosus Amine & Euzet, 2005 
 Lamellodiscus triacies Diamanka, Neifar, Pariselle & Euzet, 2011 
 Lamellodiscus tubulicornis Justine & Briand, 2010 
 Lamellodiscus typicus Johnston & Tiegs, 1922 
 Lamellodiscus vaginalis Byrnes, 1987 
 Lamellodiscus verberis Euzet & Oliver, 1967 
 Lamellodiscus vicinus Diamanka, Neifar, Pariselle & Euzet, 2011 
 Lamellodiscus virgula Euzet & Oliver, 1967

References

Diplectanidae
Monogenea genera
Parasites of fish